I-70  was an Imperial Japanese Navy Kaidai-type cruiser submarine commissioned in 1935. While supporting the Japanese attack on Pearl Harbor at the beginning of the Pacific campaign of World War II in December 1941, she was sunk on the third day of the war, the first fleet submarine lost in the Pacific during the war.

Construction and commissioning 
I-70 was laid down on 25 January 1933 at the Sasebo Naval Arsenal in Sasebo, Japan, and launched on 14 June 1934 with Vice Admiral Yonai Mitsumasa — who later served as Minister of the Navy from 1937 to 1939 and as Prime Minister of Japan from January to July 1940 — in attendance for her launching ceremony. She was completed and commissioned on 9 November 1935.

Service history

Pre-World War II
On the day of her commissioning, I-70 was attached to the Kure Naval District and assigned to Submarine Division 12 as the division′s new flagship. Her division was assigned to Submarine Squadron 2 in the 2nd Fleet, a component of the Combined Fleet, on 15 November 1935. On 13 April 1936, she got underway from Fukuoka, Japan, in company with the other two submarines of her division — I-68 and I-69 — for a training cruise off China in the Tsingtao area, which the submarines completed with their arrival at Sasebo on 22 April 1936. The three submarines departed Mako in the Pescadores Islands off  Formosa on 4 August 1936 for a training cruise in the Amoy area off China, returning to Mako on 6 September 1936. 

On 15 December 1938, I-70 was decommissioned and placed in third reserve in the Kure Naval District. On 24 August 1939, she began a refit and overhaul at the Kure Naval Arsenal in Kure, Japan, during which she received an improved attack computer and a Type 93 passive sonar. Submarine Division 12 was reassigned to Submarine Squadron 3 in the 2nd Fleet on 15 November 1939.

With her refit complete, I-70 was recommissioned in time to join I-68, I-69, and the submarines , I-74, and I-75 for a training cruise, departing Okinawa on 27 March 1940 and training in southern Chinese waters before the six submarines arrived at Takao, Formosa, on 2 April 1940. Submarine Squadron 3 was reassigned to the 6th Fleet on 15 November 1940.

I-69 relieved I-70 as Submarine Division 12 flagship on 26 January 1941, but I-70 resumed her role as division flagship on 30 March 1941. On 12 May 1941, I-70 collided with I-69, suffering a long gash forward in her starboard ballast tanks aft almost as far as her conning tower, while I-69 suffered bow damage. Both submarines reached Yokosuka, Japan, for repairs.

By 11 November 1941, Submarine Squadron 3 had been assigned to the 6th Fleet′s Advance Force. That day, the 6th Fleet's commander, Vice Admiral Mitsumi Shimizu, held a meeting with the commanding officers of the submarines of the squadron aboard his flagship, the light cruiser , and his chief of staff briefed them on plans for Operation Z, the upcoming surprise attack on Pearl Harbor in Hawaii. The attack would begin the Pacific campaign and bring Japan and the United States into World War II.

As Japanese military forces began to deploy for the opening Japanese offensive of the war, I-70 departed Saeki Bay on the coast of Kyushu on 11 November 1941 in company with the submarines , I-68, I-69, I-71, I-72, and I-73 bound for Kwajalein Atoll, which she reached on 20 November 1941. Assigned to support Operation Z, I-70 got underway from Kwajalein on 23 November 1941 and set course for the Hawaiian Islands. While she was en route, she received the message "Climb Mount Niitaka 1208" from the Combined Fleet on 2 December 1941, indicating that war with the Allies would commence on 8 December 1941 Japan time, which was on 7 December 1941 on the other side of the International Date Line in Hawaii.

World War II

First war patrol 
Along with the rest of Submarine Squadron 3, I-70 was part of a group of submarines ordered to patrol south of Oahu during the attack on Pearl Harbor, with orders to  attack American ships attempting to sortie from Pearl Harbor. The 6th Fleet′s headquarters aboard Katori at Kwajalein attempted to contact her at midnight that night, but she did not respond.

The Japanese never heard from her again.

Loss

I-6 attempted to attack Enterprise, but was forced to go deep before she could. Several hours later she managed to transmit a sighting report, which resulted in the 6th Fleet ordering nine submarines — Submarine Squadron 1 and several other submarines, including I-70 — to attempt to intercept Enterprise, which the Japanese assumed was bound for the United States West Coast.

During the afternoon, another VS-6 SBD sighted I-70 on the surface in the same area. The dive bomber attacked, its bomb landing alongside I-70 amidships and blowing several of her crew overboard. I-70 went dead in the water and sank on an even keel at  45 seconds after the bomb exploded. The Dauntless′s crew observed four men struggling in the water and saw a bubble of oil and foamy water appear on the surface, followed by two more bubbles containing oil and debris.

The Sixth Fleet's headquarters was unable to contact I-70, although it continued to try even after the other two submarines of her division returned to Kwajalein. The Imperial Japanese Navy declared I-70 to be presumed lost with all 93 hands off Hawaii and on 15 March 1942 removed her from the Navy list. She was the first Japanese warship sunk by U.S. aircraft during World War II and the first fleet submarine lost in the Pacific campaign of World War II.

References

1933 ships
Ships built by Sasebo Naval Arsenal
Kaidai-class submarines
World War II submarines of Japan
Attack on Pearl Harbor
World War II shipwrecks in the Pacific Ocean
Maritime incidents in May 1941
Maritime incidents in December 1941
Japanese submarines lost during World War II
Submarines sunk by aircraft
Ships sunk by US aircraft
Warships lost in combat with all hands
Japanese submarine accidents